The New Zealand Medical Journal (NZMJ) is a peer-reviewed medical journal. It is the official journal of the New Zealand Medical Association.

Description
The NZMJ was established in September 1887 by the New Zealand Branch of the British Medical Association. The  editor-in-chief is Frank Frizelle. The journal is a member of the International Committee of Medical Journal Editors. It has been published online since July 2002, was a key asset of the New Zealand Medical Association (NZMA) up until the 8th of July 2022, when the parent body, NZMA services, was put into liquidation. It is now owned by the Pasifika Medical Association Group (PMAG). The journal publishes editorials, original articles, case reports, viewpoint, and letters. There is a four-tier system of subscriber access, with articles older than six months and abstracts being open access.

Editors
 Walter Fell (1855–1932), 1906–1911
 Frank Frizelle, ?–present

See also 
 List of medical journals
 Health care in New Zealand

References

External links 
 

Magazines published in New Zealand
New Zealand Medical Association
Publications established in 1887
General medical journals
English-language journals
Academic journals published by learned and professional societies
1887 establishments in New Zealand